Chrysanthemum lavandulifolium is a flowering plant within the family Asteraceae and the genus Chrysanthemum. It is a perennial flowering plant that is often noted because of its yellow flowers. It has 18 chromosomes at the diploid stage.

Description
The morphology of the plant consists of a herb and its flower. The herb is erect, and the flowers have yellow sepals and multiple carpals. The herb has a green, oblong leaf with pinnate venation. These leaves are about 5–7 cm in length and 4–6 cm in width. The leaf blade is broad, while the base is suddenly narrowed and of an ovate or lanceolate lobed shape. The leaves are in alternate arrangement throughout the stem. In addition, it has a broad sinus base with "dorsifixed pubescence" underneath. The petiole is about 1–2 cm long. 
The rhizome is short, while the stem is erect, long branched, and colored white pubescent. Also, there are only a few stem-leaves. The herb grows from 100 to 150 cm.

C. lavandulifolium flowers grow in a corymb-style head and are terminal. They also have yellow heads that contain multiple carpals; these stretch from 14–15 mm in diameter. They also contain three or four oblong bracts that have soft tissue and are elliptical and tipped. These bracts have hemispherical involucre or coverings. In addition, the yellow corollas of the flower are about 5–7 mm long and 1.5–2 mm wide These heads stretch to about 1.5 cm in diameter. These bisexual florets have obtuse and irregular anther bases. They have pistillate ray florets that can be yellow or white. From these pistillates, they produce achenes, which are indehiscent and angled. The pappus, a modified calyx, is not present or extremely small.

Taxonomy
The species was first described in 1872 by Ernst von Trautvetter as Pyrethrum lavandulifolium, with the name attributed to Friedrich von Fischer. In 1909, Tomitaro Makino placed the species in Chrysanthemum when describing Chrysanthemum boreale (which he had mentioned as a variety of C. indicum in 1902). He noted that C. boreale "came very near" to C. lavandulifolium. The two are now treated as one species.

When it became understood that Linnaeus's Chrysanthemum, which was typified by a Mediterranean annual species, was distinct from the largely Asian perennial species, these latter, including C. lavandulifolium and C. boreale, were initially given names in the genus Dendranthema. In 1999, the genus name Chrysanthemum was conserved for the Asian species, so the name Chrysanthemum lavandulifolium became acceptable again.

Distribution
C. lavandulifolium naturally occurs or is native to regions of eastern Asia such as Korea, Japan, and China. In China, it is found in the provinces Gansu, Sichuan, and Yunnan. In Japan, it is found primarily in Honshu and Kyushu. In Korea, it is found in Gyeongsangbuk, Gangwon, and Chungcheongbuk. Chrysanthemums may have been introduced to Japan by Chinese in the eighth century AD.

Habitat and ecology
C. lavandulifolium, a perennial plant, grows well in warm climates around East Asia. It flowers from October to November. The plant grows well on moist clayey soils in full sun. It is also quite immune to high temperatures and lack of moisture.

Medicinal use
In Korea, C. lavandulifolium has been used to treat vertigo, a type of dizziness, in traditional medicine. In addition, its flowers have been used as an antipyretic. It has been also noted to have anti-inflammatory effects on disease such as atopic dermatitis.

Diseases
This particular type of chrysanthemum is noted to be affected by black plight. In addition, in Korea and other Asian countries, C. lavandulifolium has contracted a downy mildew infection caused by Paraperonospora minor. The fungi-like agents grow on leaves and turn them a yellowish color, and the plant eventually wilts until it dies out. This study was the first to find C. lavandulifolium with this infection.

Notes

References

lavandulifolium
Plants described in 1909